Mitromorpha separanda is a species of sea snail, a marine gastropod mollusk in the family Mitromorphidae.

Description

Distribution
This marine species occurs off Senegal

References

 Maltzan, H.F. von, Diagnosen neuer senegambischer Gastropoden. Nachr. deutsch. Malak. Gesell. 1848

External links
 

separanda
Gastropods described in 1884